The French Covered Court Championships  its original name also known as the French Covered Court Open Championships   and the French Indoors   was a tennis event held from 1895 through 1971 in Paris, France and Lyon, France.

History
The French Covered Court Championships was played at the Tennis Club de Paris the original location was Rue de Civry in the 16th arrondissement of Paris shortly before the beginning of the 1st World War it changed location to Port de Saint Cloud until shortly after the 2nd World War when it moved again to its current location at 91 Boulevard Exelmans, Auteuil, Paris, France. The club still exists today, it originally had four very fast Indoor (Oak Parquet Wood) courts and five Outdoor Clay courts. The tournament was one of earliest events open to international players for the indoor event the staging of the tournament tended to fluctuate between February, April and November annually the men's competition ceased in 1969 but the women's continued until 1971, it ran for 69 editions and was an early predecessor of the current Paris Masters.

Champions
Notes: Challenge round: The final round of a tournament, in which the winner of a single-elimination phase faces the previous year's champion, who plays only that one match. The challenge round was used in the early history of tennis (from 1877 through 1921) in some tournaments not all. (c) Indicates challenger

Men's singles

Women's singles
Notes: The women's tournament of 1968 were played twice in * Paris and ** Lyon.

See also
 Fédération Française de Tennis
 Paris Masters – successor to the French Covered Court Championships

Notes

References
 Ayre's Lawn Tennis Almanack And Tournament Guide, A. Wallis Myers. UK.
 Dunlop Lawn Tennis Almanack and Tournament Guide, G.P. Hughes, 1939 to 1958, Published by Dunlop Sports Co. Ltd., UK.
 Lawn Tennis and Badminton Magazines, 1896–1901, Amateur Sports Publishing Co. Ltd., London, UK.
 Lawn Tennis and Croquet Magazines, 1901–1920, Amateur Sports Publishing Co. Ltd., London, UK.
 Lowe's Lawn Tennis Annuals and Compendia, Lowe, Sir F. Gordon, Eyre & Spottiswoode, London, UK.

External links
 Tennisarchives.com – French Covered Court Championships Roll of Honour

Defunct tennis tournaments in France
Indoor tennis tournaments
Wood court tennis tournaments